Jeff Moran (born 7 January 1947) is a former Australian rules footballer who played for St Kilda in the Victorian Football League (VFL). He also played a season at VFA side Dandenong.

External links

Australian rules footballers from Victoria (Australia)
1947 births
St Kilda Football Club players
St Kilda Football Club Premiership players
Dandenong Football Club players
Living people
One-time VFL/AFL Premiership players